Diana Sujew (born 2 November 1990 in Riga, Latvia) is a German athlete who specialises in the middle-distance running. She was the German 1500m champion in 2011. She qualified for 2016 Summer Olympics where she competed in the women's 1500 m. She finished 9th in her semifinal and did not advance to the final.

Her sister Elina Sujew is also a runner.

Personal bests

Outdoor

Indoor

References

External links 

 
 
 
 

1990 births
Living people
German female middle-distance runners
German female steeplechase runners
Athletes (track and field) at the 2016 Summer Olympics
Olympic athletes of Germany
Athletes from Riga
21st-century German women